Beyond a Steel Sky is a 2020 cyberpunk science fiction adventure game, written by Charles Cecil, and developed by Revolution Software. Set ten years after the events of the 1994 video game Beneath a Steel Sky, players assume the role of Robert Foster as he finds himself returning to Union City on the hunt for a kidnapped child, only to learn that the city's new utopia state is not what it appears to be. The game's design utilized the Unreal Engine 4, focusing on cel-shaded 3D graphics, including comic book-styled text boxes.

The game was released on 26 June 2020 on the Apple Arcade subscription service for iOS and tvOS, and on July 16 on Steam for macOS, Windows, and Linux, and on Nintendo Switch, PlayStation 4, PlayStation 5,  Xbox One and Xbox Series X/S on November 30, 2021 and published by Microids. Following its release, it received positive reviews from critics.

Plot

Beyond a Steel Sky takes place within a far-future Earth, in which mega-cities, such as Union City, exist within a world that has been ravaged by nuclear war and disasters. While those who reside in such cities are subject to their laws and views on society by major corporations, those who reside outside them in the vast wastes (referred to as The Gap) live within tribal communities that survive on trading, hunting and other skills, with such people referred to by city dwellers as Gaplanders. The game's story is set ten years after the events of Beneath a Steel Sky, and focuses on the life of Robert Foster - a Gaplander who formerly resided in Union City as a child, until certain events led to him being exiled unwillingly and raised by a local tribe that found him. The plot, written by Charles Cecil, focuses on the concept of how an AI would interpret a prime directive to make people happy.

Reception 

Dark Station praised the game: "Beyond a Steel Sky is in many ways respectful of genre traditions but with modern wisdom and presentation. The game can be enjoyed without prior knowledge of Beneath a Steel Sky but obviously, it has a lot of gentle nods to its predecessor." GameWatcher wrote that the game "has big shoes to fill [and] not only fills that shoe, but it knocks the definition of a modern adventure game out of the park. It does everything Telltale games do right, and corrects everything they do wrong."

GameGrin described it as "a fantastic adventure with some at-times brain bending puzzles that stays remarkably true to the original game. Some minor technical issues mar the experience slightly but it’s a great return for Foster and Joey." PC Invasion wrote that "Beyond a Steel Sky has some technical issues but its excellent writing and interesting storytelling make it well worth experiencing." Godisageek similarly wrote that "the humour and mystery are enough to carry Beyond A Steel Sky through, and if you did play the original and you do remember it, there’s just enough nostalgia here to make it worth a return to Union City. If you didn’t, well, it’s still a likeable, competent adventure game that will keep you smiling and guessing throughout."

References

2020 video games
Video games developed in the United Kingdom
Single-player video games
Adventure games
Cyberpunk video games
Science fiction video games
Dystopian video games
Nintendo Switch games
PlayStation 4 games
Xbox One games
MacOS games
Microïds games
Windows games
Video game sequels